Junk Culture is the fifth studio album by English electronic band Orchestral Manoeuvres in the Dark (OMD), released on 30 April 1984 by Virgin Records. After the commercial disappointment of the experimental 1983 album Dazzle Ships, OMD and Virgin intended for the group to shift towards a more accessible sound on its follow-up release. The band retained much of their early experimental approach but embraced a wider range of influences than previously, drawing inspiration from pop, dance, Latin and black music. The record's musical style has been characterised as "Talking Heads-meets-Kraftwerk".

Junk Culture became OMD's fourth consecutive Top 10 album in the UK. It spawned four singles, including the UK Top 20 entries "Locomotion" and "Talking Loud and Clear", and the club hit "Tesla Girls". The record met with largely positive reviews and has been named as one of the best of 1984. It was remastered and re-released in 2015, with a bonus disc of B-sides and extended mixes.

Background

Virgin Records had been shocked by the hostile critical and commercial response to experimental predecessor album Dazzle Ships (1983). OMD were compelled to sell more records in order to maintain their deal with the label, and consequently moved in a more radio-friendly direction. Keyboardist Paul Humphreys recalled, "We made an album to save our career, really. If we'd done another Dazzle Ships, Virgin would definitely have dropped us." The band elected not to record in their own Gramophone Suite studio in Liverpool; instead, McCluskey and Humphreys wrote and demoed songs separately at home. Neither man satisfied with the results of this approach, OMD regrouped, working at Highland Studios in Inverness for three weeks. The band trialled some of the new compositions on a September 1983 UK club tour, with Howard Jones as support. Afterwards, they recorded with producer Brian Tench at both Chapel Studios in Lincolnshire, and Mayfair Studios in London. In contrast to the arduous Dazzle Ships era, recording sessions were positive and the group were writing prolifically.

A single release of "Tesla Girls" was considered for late 1983 but was rejected by Virgin, who insisted the band concentrate on the album. OMD and Tench then moved on to AIR Studios in the "paradise setting" of Montserrat, introducing a newly-acquired Fairlight CMI sampler keyboard; the group had followed advice to leave the UK and become tax exiles, in order to preserve royalties from the successful Architecture & Morality (1981). The sessions lasted two months, during which time OMD were inspired by the sounds of local calypso and reggae music, including those of Montserratian musician Arrow. The band also incorporated various pop, dance, R&B and Latin influences into their recordings, while retaining much of their trademark sonic experimentation. The songs deviated somewhat from the minimal OMD style of old, taking on more of a full band sound under the direction of Tench.

When the group ran out of studio time in Montserrat, they returned to Europe to finish off the album at the more affordable ICP Studios in Brussels. Producer Tony Visconti was recruited to assist with the record, but was unavailable until three weeks later; the band took a break and went travelling, which dispelled simmering doubts about the new material. Having been unimpressed by ICP, the group reconvened at Wisseloord in Hilversum, Netherlands. Visconti was already satisfied with Tench and OMD's production efforts: his main contributions were the addition and arrangement of brass parts on "Locomotion" and "All Wrapped Up". The working relationship was strained, with Humphreys stating, "The record company suggested we bring in Tony Visconti. We thought, 'Great,' because he'd worked with [David] Bowie. But he really didn't understand us. There's a great quote in his book where he says something like, 'Those guys rely far too much on technology. I wanted to bring musicians into the band.' He really didn't get us." Mixing of Junk Culture was completed by Tench. According to OMD's official site, recording also took place at The Manor, Shipton-on-Cherwell.

McCluskey said of the album's title in 1984, "We began to appreciate that it wasn't enough to simply dismiss popular culture as being worthless, that there is some merit in almost everything; video, computer games, junk food, pop music and so on." He added that "the lyrics reflect a sort of loss of inhibitions - the idea that you don't have to think something is artistically right in order to enjoy it." In a 2019 interview McCluskey expanded upon the choice of title: "I was fully aware we were going to get hammered... I was desperate for a title that would legitimise us making a pop album: it's acceptable as long as you do it knowingly." "Love and Violence" was considered as a title, owing to the record's contrast between love songs and more aggressive tracks. As with previous albums, the cover artwork was designed by Peter Saville Associates (with photography by Richard Houghton). For the first time OMD supplied lyrics on the record's inner sleeve.

Release
Junk Culture was released on 30 April 1984 and entered the UK Albums Chart a week later, the same week that lead single "Locomotion" was at its chart peak of No. 5. Limited pressings of the vinyl LP came with a free one-sided 7-inch single featuring the track "(The Angels Keep Turning) The Wheels of the Universe". The record entered the UK Albums Chart at No. 9, outselling the new album by contemporaries the Cure (The Top), although beaten by fellow Liverpudlians Echo & the Bunnymen, whose Ocean Rain entered at No. 4. All three records gradually dropped down the charts in successive weeks. Sales of Junk Culture were boosted during the release of the second single "Talking Loud and Clear", although it dropped out of the Top 40 altogether in August. Third single "Tesla Girls" did not make the UK Top 20 but became one of the band's biggest club hits. A fourth single, "Never Turn Away", was released at the behest of Virgin.

Junk Culture was the first OMD album to be released contemporaneously on all three formats of vinyl, cassette and compact disc.

Critical reception

Junk Culture met with a largely positive critical reception, although the UK music press showed less enthusiasm than the country's mainstream outlets. What Hi-Fi? felt the record "seems to lack some of the substance of previous albums", while NME saw it as "never fresh or dynamic" and "all too predictable". Johnny Black of Smash Hits said "the special moments that turn excellence into magic are fewer and further between", but acknowledged the record as an "accessible" work that "still reveals some brave moves". An ardent supporter within the British music press was Record Mirrors Robin Smith, who awarded the album a full five stars, and wrote, "Junk Culture is a living, breathing, musical menagerie filled with a hard core of ideas culled from virtually the four corners of the world... Smooth, warm and powerful." Robin Denselow of The Guardian gave a favourable review indicative of mainstream media opinion, observing a musically diverse record that is "bursting with life and enthusiasm" while offering "an unusual and catchy set of songs".

Internationally, The Sydney Morning Heralds Henry Everingham was pleased that OMD had "finally released an extremely accessible album", on which "nearly every song has the word 'single' stamped". James Muretich of the Calgary Herald wrote that Junk Culture achieves "the kind of glorious fusion of progressive electronic sounds and pop music that marked Architecture & Morality in '81", calling it "a subtle, seductive pop recording with brains to boot". The Ottawa Citizens Evelyn Erskine noted a musical eclecticism complemented by a "deft use of experimental techniques", asserting, "Of the countless bands that make up the synth-pop invasion, Orchestral Manoeuvres in the Dark has shown a greater ability to progress creatively than most." Marc D. Allan of The Boston Globe said the record had "four potential hits" but is a "hit-or-miss album" overall. Eurotipsheet named Junk Culture "Album of the Week" for 14 May; on 12 November, CMJ reporters named it one of the 10 best recent albums.

Summarising Junk Culture in a retrospective article, SF Weeklys Tim Casagrande dubbed it OMD's "Talking Heads-meets-Kraftwerk album". John Bergstrom of PopMatters referred to "immaculate pop singles... set against an eclectic, equally-accomplished backdrop", while AllMusic's Ned Raggett noted "all the best qualities of OMD at their most accessible — instantly memorable melodies and McCluskey's distinct singing voice, clever but emotional lyrics, and fine playing all around." Paul Scott-Bates of Louder Than War stated that Junk Culture is "simply one of those timeless albums" and "certainly a worthwhile addition to any music collection whether [an] OMD fan or not."

Legacy
Junk Culture has been listed as one of 1984's best albums. M. Scot Skinner of the Arizona Daily Star and Anne Hull at the St. Petersburg Times ranked it No. 2 and No. 4 respectively, the former observing "an impressively moody collection that displays almost unbelievable pop imagination". The record was placed at No. 386 in CMJ's "Top 1000, 1979–1989". Tony Kanal of No Doubt – a band heavily influenced by OMD – declared Junk Culture to be a "great" album, while actor and writer Scott Aukerman cited it as an example of the alternative music that "shaped [his] identity".

Both McCluskey and Humphreys concede that the commercial disappointment of 1983's Dazzle Ships caused OMD to become "safer" in their work, but they nevertheless consider Junk Culture to be a strong album. McCluskey said of the record, "I think it's possibly the tipping point of our career in terms of the quality of our music... it's the last one we made where we were in complete control and we had time to do it. Thereafter we were running out of time to make albums. It's an interesting marker in our career."

Deluxe reissue (2015)
A deluxe CD re-issue of Junk Culture was announced via the band's official website and Facebook page on 17 December 2014, and was released on 2 February 2015. The deluxe edition included the remastered original album and a bonus disc with a collection of B-sides and extended mixes, many of which had not been previously released on CD. Five previously unreleased tracks were also featured, including "All or Nothing" with Humphreys on vocals, "10 to 1", and three demos. Fans alerted the group and the label to a number of content errors, prompting Universal Music to re-manufacture the bonus disc. Fans also reported that "Tesla Girls" and "Love and Violence" were different mixes than were featured on the original album, although the main disc was not re-manufactured.

Previously unreleased tracks
 "10 to 1" is a song with vocals by Andy McCluskey which would later become the album track "Love and Violence" and features some of the same lyrics
 "All or Nothing" is a slower track featuring Paul Humphreys on vocals.
 "Heaven Is (Highland Studios demo)" – this song was originally played live on OMD's showcase tour in the autumn of 1983 – as were tracks such as "Junk Culture", "Tesla Girls" and "Never Turn Away" – but never made it to the album ("Heaven Is" also nearly made 1986 album The Pacific Age). A new version was included on the Liberator (1993) album.
 "Tesla Girls (Highland Studios demo)"/"White Trash (Highland Studios demo)" – both songs eventually made it onto the album.

B-sides "The Avenue", "Wrappup", the re-recorded version of "Julia's Song" and extended mixes of "Tesla Girls", "Never Turn Away" and "Talking Loud and Clear" were available on CD for the first time.

"Julia's Song (Dub Version)" 10-inch single 
"Julia's Song (Dub Version)" was kept as a limited-edition 10-inch release for the 2015 Record Store Day. It is the same track as the first part of "Julia's Song (Extended Version)", B-side to the 1984 "Talking Loud and Clear" 12-inch single, the second part of which was included on the Junk Culture deluxe edition bonus CD. The track "10 to 1" was used as the B-side to this release. The original version of "Julia's Song" appears on the band's debut album Orchestral Manoeuvres in the Dark (1980).

Track listing
 All songs written by OMD.
 The US release has a modified track listing, shifting "Junk Culture" to track 3, between "Locomotion" and "Apollo", therefore opening with "Tesla Girls".
 Writing credits below from ASCAP database.

(Tracks 11–15 previously unreleased)

Personnel
Orchestral Manoeuvres in the Dark (OMD)
 Paul Humphreys — vocals, Roland Jupiter-8, E-mu Emulator, Korg M-500 Micro Preset, acoustic piano, Fairlight CMI, celeste, Prophet 5
 Andy McCluskey — vocals, bass guitar, guitar, Roland Jupiter-8, E-mu Emulator, Fairlight CMI, Latin percussion
 Martin Cooper — Prophet 5, E-mu Emulator, tenor and soprano saxophones, Roland SH2, marimba
 Malcolm Holmes — acoustic and electronic drums, Latin percussion, drum computer programming

Additional musicians
 Gordan Troeller — piano on "Locomotion", Roland Jupiter-8 on "White Trash"
 Maureen Humphreys — vocals on "Tesla Girls"
 Jan Faas, Jan Vennik, Bart van Lier — brass section on "Locomotion" and "All Wrapped Up"
 Tony Visconti — brass arrangements on "Locomotion" and "All Wrapped Up"
 Bob Ludwig — mastering

Charts

Weekly charts

Year-end charts

Certifications

References

External links
 Album lyrics
 

1984 albums
Albums recorded at AIR Studios
Orchestral Manoeuvres in the Dark albums
Virgin Records albums